Dynactin associated protein is a protein that in humans is encoded by the DYNAP gene.

References

Further reading